is a Japanese animation studio established in 2009 as an extension of Bee Train Production and chaired by Ryoji Maru, a former producer and production manager for Bee Train.

In 2012, C-Station split from Bee Train and in 2013, it was announced that it would be animating the series Dragonar Academy, making it their first produced show.

Works

Television series
Dragonar Academy (2014)
Star-Myu (2015–2019)
Laid-Back Camp (2018–2021)
Hakyū Hoshin Engi (2018)
Heya Camp (2020)
Opus Colors (2023)

Films
Laid-Back Camp Movie (2022)

OVA/ONAs
Akame ga Kill! Theater (2014) (with White Fox)
Star-Myu (2016–2018)
Laid-Back Camp (2018–2020)

Notes

References

External links
  
  
 

 
Japanese companies established in 2009
Animation studios in Tokyo
Mass media companies established in 2009
Japanese animation studios